The following is a list of episodes from the series Transformers: Cyberverse.

Series overview

Episodes

Chapter One (2018)

Chapter Two: Power of the Spark (2019–20)

Chapter Three: Bumblebee Cyberverse Adventures (2020)

Chapter Four: Bumblebee Cyberverse Adventures (2021)

Notes

References 

Cyberverse
Transformers: Cyberverse